Symphony is a yacht owned by Bernard Arnault. At the time of its completion in 2015, Symphony was the longest yacht ever built in the Netherlands.

Symphony was built by Feadship. Designed to carry 20 passengers in 8 cabins and with a crew of 38 in 16 cabins, it complied with the Passenger Yacht Code. Symphony has a  glass-bottom swimming pool on the main deck, an outdoor cinema on the bridge deck, and a jacuzzi on the sun deck. A sauna, a private office and a study, a lounge and an aft deck area for lounging with a dining table for 20 are included. The ship's exterior was designed by Tim Heywood. 

The yacht is sailing under Cayman Islands flag.

Engine
Symphony has four main diesel engines (Type: MTU 20V 4000 M73 – )  each.

See also 
 List of motor yachts by length
 List of yachts built by Feadship

References

2015 ships
Motor yachts
Ships built in the Netherlands